KRR may refer to:

 FK Jūrnieks, a Latvian football club, known as KRR from 1964 to 1968
 Kallio Rolling Rainbow, a Finnish roller derby league
 Kiamichi Railroad, reporting mark
 Krasnodar International Airport, North Caucasus, Russia, IATA Code
 Kommissarische Reichsregierung, a German political movement
 K. R. Ramasamy (actor)
 Knowledge representation and reasoning in artificial intelligence

See also
 KRR1, a protein